Toirdhealbhach Ó Briain (some sources Terence) (died 1569) was a bishop in Ireland during the second half of the sixteenth century.

Ó Briain was appointed Bishop of Killaloe on 25 June 1554 when they were temporarily reunited under Queen Mary I: in a letter of 12 October 1561, the papal legate Fr David Wolfe SJ described all the bishops in Munster as 'adherents of the Queen';

References

1569 deaths
16th-century Roman Catholic bishops in Ireland
People from County Clare